Martin Goodwin (born 15 January 1960) is a former speedway rider from England.

Speedway career 
Goodwin reached the final of the British Speedway Championship in 1993. He rode in the top tier of British Speedway from 1984 to 1996, riding for various clubs.

References 

Living people
1960 births
British speedway riders
Lakeside Hammers riders
Eastbourne Eagles riders
Oxford Cheetahs riders
Rye House Rockets riders